Van der Veen Ice Stream, formerly Ice Stream B1, is a large southeastern tributary to the Whillans Ice Stream in Marie Byrd Land, Antarctica. Named by Advisory Committee on Antarctic Names (US-ACAN) after Cornelis J. "Kees" van der Veen, Byrd Polar Research Center and Departments of Geological Sciences and Geography, Ohio State University; glacial theoretician and collaborator with Ian Whillans, 1986–2001, in many seminal reports on the dynamics of the West Antarctic Ice Sheet, including former Ice Stream B, now Whillans Ice Stream.

See also

 List of glaciers in the Antarctic
 List of Antarctic ice streams

References

Ice streams of Marie Byrd Land